Derek LeRoith, M.D., Ph.D  is an endocrinologist and Professor of Medicine and the current Chief of the Hilda and J. Lester Gabrilove, M.D. Division of Endocrinology, Diabetes and Bone Disease and Director of the Metabolism Institute of the Mount Sinai Medical Center in New York City. He is an international expert in insulin-like growth factor-1 (IGF-1).

LeRoith was the first to demonstrate the link between insulin-like growth factor-1 (IGF-1) and cancer and is the current recipient of an NCI grant to study the relationship between cancer and type 2 diabetes. He is the author of more than 500 publications and an editor of more than 20 textbooks on endocrinology.

Biography
LeRoith was born in 1945 in South Africa. He earned both his M.B. Ch.B. and his Ph.D. from the University of Cape Town. In 1974, he became a fellow of the College of Physicians of South Africa, and, in 1975, he became a member of the Royal College of Physicians of the United Kingdom. His post-doctoral training included a residency in pediatrics at the Kaplan Medical Center in Rehovot, Israel, an endocrine research fellowship at the University of Cape Town, and a residency in medicine and geriatrics at Middlesex Hospital in London.

In Israel, LeRoith held a lectureship in medicine and endocrinology at the Ben-Gurion University of the Negev.  In 1979, he joined the United States' National Institutes of Health and eventually became the Chief of its Diabetes Branch of the Institute of Diabetes and Digestive and Kidney Diseases.

LeRoith is a board member for the Council for the Advancement of Diabetes Research and Education and the Endocrine Fellows Foundation. He serves on the scientific advisory board of Medingo, Ltd. and is a past member of the national board of directors for the American Diabetes Association. He has served on the editorial board of 18 journals, including Endocrinology, Experimental Cell Research, the Journal of Clinical Endocrinology and Metabolism, the Journal of Clinical Investigation, the American Journal of Physiology and the Journal of Biological Chemistry. He served on the review committees of the United States Department of Veterans Affairs and the American Diabetes Association. He is also the editor-in-chief of Frontiers in Endocrinology and Endocrine Practice.

Honors and awards
1963	Medal for Physiology
1966	Medal for Obstetrics and Gynecology
1973	Bronte Stewart Award for Ph.D. Thesis
1996	British Endocrine Society Transatlantic Medal
1996	The Herman O.  Mosenthal Memorial Lecture
2004	The Yogesh C. Patel Memorial Lecture
2008	 Dell Fisher Visiting Professor, UCLA

Books
Partial list:
Diabetes Mellitus: a Fundamental and Clinical text, Derek LeRoith (Editor), Simeon I. Taylor (Editor) and Jerrold M Olefsky (Editor), 2003 (Third Edition), 
Molecular Biology of Diabetes, Part I: Autoimmunity and Genetics; Insulin Synthesis and Secretion, Boris Draznin (Editor), Derek LeRoith (Editor), 1994, 
Molecular Biology of Diabetes, Part II: Insulin Action, Effects on Gene Expression and Regulation, and Glucose Transport, Boris Draznin (Editor), Derek LeRoith (Editor), 1994, 
Insulin-like Growth Factors: Molecular and Cellular Aspects, Derek LeRoith (Author), 1991, 
Controversies in Treating Diabetes: Clinical and Research Aspects (Contemporary Endocrinology), Derek LeRoith (Editor), Aaron I. Vinik (Editor), 2008,

Publications
Partial list:
Insulin sensitizing therapy attenuates type 2 diabetes-mediated mammary tumor progression. Fierz Y, Novosyadlyy R, Vijayakumar A, Yakar S, Leroith D. Diabetes. 3 December 2009.  
High-efficient FLPo deleter mice in C57BL/6J background. Wu Y, Wang C, Sun H, LeRoith D, Yakar S. PLoS One. 26 November 2009;4(11):e8054.  
Pediatric endocrinology: Part II. Foreword. LeRoith D. Endocrinol Metab Clin North Am. 2009 Dec;38(4):xi-xiii.  
Biological effects of growth hormone on carbohydrate and lipid metabolism. Vijayakumar A, Novosyadlyy R, Wu Y, Yakar S, Leroith D. Growth Horm IGF Res. 30 September 2009.   
Pediatric endocrinology: part I. Foreword. Leroith D. Endocrinol Metab Clin North Am. 2009 Sep;38(3):xi-xiii.  
Physical and functional interaction between polyoma virus middle T antigen and insulin and IGF-I receptors is required for oncogene activation and tumour initiation. Novosyadlyy R, Vijayakumar A, Lann D, Fierz Y, Kurshan N, LeRoith D. Oncogene. 1 October 2009;28(39):3477-86. Epub 20 July 2009.  
Gender differences in metabolic disorders. LeRoith D. Gend Med. 2009;6(Suppl 1):1-3.  
Elevated levels of insulin-like growth factor (IGF)-I in serum rescue the severe growth retardation of IGF-1 null mice. Wu Y, Sun H, Yakar S, LeRoith D" Endocrinology 2009 Sep;150(9):4395-403. Epub 4 June 2009.  
Apolipoprotein E deficiency abrogates insulin resistance in a mouse model of type 2 diabetes mellitus. Kawashima Y, Chen J, Sun H, Lann D, Hajjar RJ, Yakar S, Leroith D" Diabetologia 2009 Jul;52(7):1434-41. Epub 13 May 2009.  
Basic aspects and clinical applicability in the field of lipidology. Foreword. LeRoith D. Endocrinol Metab Clin North Am. 2009 Mar;38(1):xiii-xv.  
Type 2 diabetic mice demonstrate slender long bones with increased fragility secondary to increased osteoclastogenesis. Kawashima Y, Fritton JC, Yakar S, Epstein S, Schaffler MB, Jepsen KJ, LeRoith D" Bone 2009 Apr;44(4):648-55. Epub 24 December 2008.  
Murine osteosarcoma primary tumour growth and metastatic progression is maintained after marked suppression of serum insulin-like growth factor I. Hong SH, Briggs J, Newman R, Hoffman K, Mendoza A, LeRoith D, Helman L, Yakar S, Khanna C. Int J Cancer. 1 May 2009;124(9):2042-9.  
Rationale and strategies for early detection and management of diabetic kidney disease. Radbill B,  Murphy B, LeRoith D. Mayo Clin Proc. 2008 Dec;83(12):1373-81. Review.  
The role of endocrine insulin-like growth factor-I and insulin in breast cancer. Lann D, LeRoith D. J Mammary Gland Biol Neoplasia. 2008 Dec;13(4):371-9. Epub 22 November 2008. Review.

References

External links
The Mount Sinai Hospital homepage
The Mount Sinai School of Medicine homepage

1945 births
Cancer researchers
Living people
Icahn School of Medicine at Mount Sinai faculty
University of Cape Town alumni